The consensus 1948 College Basketball All-American team, as determined by aggregating the results of three major All-American teams.  To earn "consensus" status, a player must win honors from a majority of the following teams: the Associated Press, the Helms Athletic Foundation, and Converse.

1948 Consensus All-America team

Individual All-America teams

AP Honorable Mention:

 Billy Joe Adcock, Vanderbilt
 Cliff Barker, Kentucky
 Leo Barnhorst, Notre Dame
 Edward Bartels, NC State
 Gene Berce, Marquette
 Nelson Bobb, Temple
 Bob Brannum, Michigan State
 Clarence Brannum, Kansas State
 Jack Burmaster, Illinois
 Leland Byrd, West Virginia
 Bobby Cook, Wisconsin
 Cliff Crandall, Oregon State
 Nate DeLong, River Falls Teachers
 Pete Elliott, Michigan
 Billy Gabor, Syracuse
 Vern Gardner, Utah
 Dee Gibson, Western Kentucky
 Tom Hamilton, Texas
 Chuck Hanger, California
 Norm Hankins, Lawrence Tech
 Bob Harris, Oklahoma A&M
 Paul Horvath, NC State
 Harold Howey, Kansas State
 Dave Humerickhouse, Bradley
 Gene James, Marshall
 Wallace Jones, Kentucky
 Leo Katkaveck, NC State
 Frank Kudelka, Saint Mary's
 Ed Lerner, Temple
 Ray Lumpp, NYU
 Al Madsen, Texas
 Slater Martin, Texas
 Mickey Marty, Loras
 Dick McGuire, St. John's
 Dave Minor, UCLA
 Joe Nelson, Brigham Young
 Jack Nichols, Washington
 Bob Paxton, North Carolina
 Warren Perkins, Tulane
 Dan Pippin, Missouri
 Kenny Rollins, Kentucky
 Frank Saul, Seton Hall
 Fred Schaus, West Virginia
 Otto Schnellbacher, Kansas
 Jack Spencer, Iowa
 John Stanich, UCLA
 Andy Tonkovich, Marshall
 Paul Unruh, Bradley
 Paul Walther, Tennessee
 Andy Wolfe, California

See also
 1947–48 NCAA men's basketball season

References

NCAA Men's Basketball All-Americans
All-Americans